Vicente Arze Camacho (born November 22, 1985 in Santa Cruz de la Sierra) is a Bolivian footballer.

Career

Youth and College
Arze attended the Franco School in his hometown of Santa Cruz de la Sierra, Bolivia, and as a teenager was part of the youth systems of famed clubs Blooming and Newell's Old Boys. He moved to Macon, Georgia in 2004 to play college soccer at Mercer University, eventually  graduating with a degree in business and marketing in May 2008.

Professional
A talented attacking midfielder who can play on flank, Arze was selected in the second round (25th overall) of the 2008 MLS Supplemental Draft by the Kansas City Wizards on January 24, 2008. He signed a two-year contract with the Whitecaps in early 2008, and played his first professional game was April 12 against Montreal Impact.

On October 2, 2008 he is nominated for Rookie of the Year (award). On December 16, 2008 the Vancouver Whitecaps announced the re-signing of Arze for the 2009 season.

Arze ended his contract with the Whitecaps at the end of the 2009 season.

On 10 December 2012, Arze was loaned out by Charleroi to Esteghlal. He made his debut on 14 December in a 4–0 win over Saipa in a Hazfi Cup match which he scored the last goal.

He returned to Blooming in January 2015 after a spell in Ukraine with Hoverla Uzhhorod.

International
Arze was part of the Bolivia U-20 squad that played in the 2003 South American U-20 championships in Uruguay. The tournament acted as the qualifiers for the 2003 U-20 World Cup finals in the United Arab Emirates. He was called up to the senior team in December 2012 just after he signed with Esteghlal.

Personal
Arze's parents are Vicente Arze sr. and Maggie Camacho. He also has a stepbrother named Jean-Pierre Arze. The midfielder comes from an accomplished sporting family. His mother is a Bolivian national champion in bowling, while his uncle Monin Camacho is a South American Rally Car champion. His cousin Diego Camacho played in the men's singles tennis tournament at the 2000 Sydney Olympics .

Honors

Vancouver Whitecaps
USL First Division (1): 2008

Esteghlal
Iran Pro League (1): 2012–13

References

External links

 Profile at Whitecaps
 Arze kicks off season strong Canada.com

1985 births
Living people
Sportspeople from Santa Cruz de la Sierra
Association football midfielders
Bolivian footballers
Bolivia international footballers
Club Blooming players
Newell's Old Boys footballers
Mercer University alumni
Vancouver Whitecaps (1986–2010) players
Vancouver Whitecaps Residency players
Club Aurora players
Diósgyőri VTK players
R. Charleroi S.C. players
Esteghlal F.C. players
FC Hoverla Uzhhorod players
USL First Division players
USL League Two players
Belgian Pro League players
Nemzeti Bajnokság I players
Bolivian expatriate footballers
Expatriate footballers in Argentina
Expatriate footballers in Belgium
Expatriate soccer players in Canada
Expatriate soccer players in the United States
Expatriate footballers in Hungary
Expatriate footballers in Iran
Expatriate footballers in Ukraine
Bolivian expatriate sportspeople in Argentina
Bolivian expatriate sportspeople in Belgium
Bolivian expatriate sportspeople in Canada
Bolivian expatriate sportspeople in the United States
Bolivian expatriate sportspeople in Hungary
Sporting Kansas City draft picks
Bolivia youth international footballers